The Mittelfranken Cup (German: Mittelfränkischer Pokal) was a domestic cup competition for the Bavarian Bezirk of Middle Franconia (German: Mittelfranken), played until 2009.

Modus
All senior men's teams from the Middle Franconia region were eligible to compete in the cup, except fully professional sides, meaning clubs in the Bundesliga and 2. Bundesliga. The winner of the Mittelfranken Cup qualified for the Bavarian Cup.

The Mittelfranken Cup in turn sub-divided into three regional cups, these regions being:
 Nürnberg/Frankenhöhe
 Erlangen/Pegnitzgrund
 Neumarkt/Jura

The three winners plus one of the runners-up advanced to the Bezirks semi-finals, the winners of the two semi-finals then advanced to the Bezirks final.

In 2007, the SV Seligenporten became the first team from Middle Franconia to win the Bavarian Cup. In 2008, the SpVgg Ansbach became the second team from the region to reach the Bavarian Cup final.

With the expansion of the Bavarian Cup from 2009–10 onwards, the Mittelfranken Cup ceased to be held.

Finals since 1975

References

Sources
 Deutschlands Fussball in Zahlen  Yearbook of German football, publisher: DSFS

External links
 The Bavarian Cup (BFV website) 
 Mittelfranken football association website 
 DFB-Kreispokal-Sieger Erlangen/Forchheim  Website on the Erlangen/Forchheim cup competition

Football cup competitions in Bavaria
Football in Middle Franconia
Defunct football competitions in Bavaria
2009 disestablishments in Germany
Recurring events disestablished in 2009
Defunct football cup competitions in Germany